This is a list of SCSI message codes.

A SCSI message code is a computer term which defines how SCSI devices send interface management information.  The message code comprises one or more bytes.

List of message formats
The first byte of the message determines the format:

List of message codes

List of extended message codes

References
 SCSI-2 Spec - Logical Characteristics

SCSI
SCSI message codes